"Quagmire's Mom" is the tenth episode of the thirteenth season of the animated sitcom Family Guy, and the 241st episode overall. It aired on Fox in the United States on February 8, 2015. In the episode, Glenn Quagmire is found guilty of unwittingly committing statutory rape and is sentenced to 20 years in prison. At the same time, his previously promiscuous but now born-again Christian mother returns to his life, and he struggles to forgive her for what he perceives as child neglect.

With an audience of 2.81 million, it was the most-watched show on Fox that night. It was also the subject of a campaign by the Parents Television Council, who believed that its sexual content broke broadcast decency laws.

Plot
When Meg needs a check for a field trip, Peter finds that his checks are fake so he insists on opening his own checking account. At Quahog Savings and Loans, Peter and Lois find that his birth certificate gives his real first name as "Justin" with his full name being "Justin Peter Griffin". Although Lois says it makes no difference, Peter immediately decides to change his persona to what he believes a "Justin" should be: young and wild. "Justin" decides to throw a party, where Quagmire meets a girl named Keira. Lois returns and orders everyone to leave, then plans to take "Justin" to City Hall to change his name back to Peter.

The next day, Quagmire learns that Keira is not 23 years old as he heard from the others at the party, and she is under the age of legal consent in Rhode Island as well as the United States. Joe arrives at Quagmire's house with some police officers stating that he has received an anonymous tip that Quagmire was having sex with an underage girl. Quagmire confesses due to his pride in having had sex with her and he is arrested by the police for violent statutory rape. He is put on trial and his only chance for leniency is for character witnesses, since he is legally guilty once the proof of Keira's age is revealed.

At the courthouse, Peter, Joe, and Cleveland try to claim Quagmire's innocence, but they each fail to do so because Peter does not give sufficient evidence due to his disgust, Joe being forced to describe what horrific , violent, and extremely degrading things Quagmire did to the girl (aged 14), and Cleveland refusing to defend him because the judge asks to state his occupation as a form of racial profiling. This causes Quagmire to take the stand himself and lie about his childhood, in particular his promiscuous mother, who was long thought to be deceased. Despite this, the judge finds Quagmire guilty due to the video evidence quagmire posted online and sentences him to 20 years in prison and revokes his citizenship, declaring him a dangerous offender. Just then, his mother Crystal arrives in the courtroom in an attempt to deny the victim justice; Crystal admits her past then claims to be a born-again Christian and asks for leniency. The judge rejects her request and gives Quagmire 24 hours to get his affairs in order.

At home, Crystal tries to get Quagmire to find God and he violently lashes out at her, severely injuring her in the process. She tries to reason with him, but he rejects her advice. Quagmire tells Crystal he will not listen to her and leaves the house to avoid her. Outside the maximum-security federal prison, Quagmire starts to say his goodbyes to his neighbors. Just then, the judge arrives with Crystal to tell Quagmire that his sentence has been commuted after "new DNA evidence was produced." He is surprised that despite her religious views she would have sex outside of marriage with the judge, but she responds that it was the most Christian (catholic) nthing to do to protect her son. She admits that she was a horrible mother and that she wants a second chance with him and he happily accepts. Peter happily observes that Quagmire got away with the crime and learned nothing, thus posing a serious danger to children in quahog.

Cultural references 

 Peter's car insurance commercial is a reference to the commercials for the General Auto Insurance Company. The same animation used for the commercials is used.
 When Peter first tries to defend Quagmire, he mentions the 2012 film Argo and its director, Ben Affleck.
 Peter's defense of Quagmire involving letters for Santa Claus is a reference to the 1947 film Miracle on 34th Street. 
 In one cutaway, Peter plays the beginning of Baba O’Riley by The Who. 
 Peter's idea that Quagmire should move to Europe to make movies after becoming a sex offender is a reference to director Roman Polanski, who moved to Europe after being arrested for statutory rape of 47 children, he is currently wanted by interpol for this.

Reception
The episode received an audience of 2.81 million, making it the most watched show on Fox that night.

The Parents Television Council, a long-time critic of Family Guy and other MacFarlane-produced shows, took offense to the episode's jokes on statutory rape, child abuse, and a description of Quagmire urinating into a condom, freezing it and using it for sexual penetration. It asked its members to complain to the Federal Communications Commission that it had broken federal indecency laws, citing that similar content in an episode of this show had been found to have breached such laws over a decade ago.

References

External links 
 

2015 American television episodes
Family Guy (season 13) episodes
Television episodes about rape
Fictional depictions of dangerous offenders